The Hakka Round House is a Hakka building in Houlong Township, Miaoli County, Taiwan.

History
The house was built by Miaoli County Government and was opened on 25 October 2014 with a cost of NT$130 million. In 2015, the county government planned to tender the operation of the building to ease its financial debt.

Architecture
The design of the brick house is based on the architecture of Tulou in Fujian. The house also consists of ring-shaped trails, arc-shaped observation deck, a welcoming square and water paths. The house has one floor underground and three floors above the ground. The basement floor consists of a multimedia viewing room, the ground floor consists of a round exhibition and performance hall, the upper floor consists of an exhibition space and the top most floor consists of DIY classrooms. The building spans over a land area of 1,385 m2 with a total floor area of 3,476 m2.

Transportation
The house is accessible from Miaoli Station of Taiwan High Speed Rail or Fengfu Station of Taiwan Railways.

See also
 List of tourist attractions in Taiwan

References

2014 establishments in Taiwan
Buildings and structures completed in 2014
Buildings and structures in Miaoli County
Hakka culture in Taiwan
Tourist attractions in Miaoli County